Cychropsis beatepuchnerae is a species of ground beetle in the subfamily of Carabinae. It was described by Klienfled & Puchner in 2007.

References

beatepuchnerae
Beetles described in 2007